Truth Will Out is a 1993 live album by Pigface. The album was recorded at Cabaret Metro in Chicago, Illinois, on December 22, 1992. While the album contains selected songs from the show, Invisible Records released the performance, in its entirety, in 2006 as part of their Pigface Live Archive series.

Track listing

Personnel
 Martin Atkins - drums
 Genesis Breyer P-Orridge - keyboards
 Jim Marcus - vocals
 Pete Conway - guitar, bass
 En Esch - vocals, guitar
 Barb Ruchoft - cello
 Nivek Ogre - vocals
 Andrew Weiss - bass
 Hope Nicholls - drums
 Matthew Schultz - anti tank guitar
 William Tucker - guitar
 Theo Van Rock - engineer

External links
 Official Pigface Discography

Pigface albums
1993 live albums